The Finnic or Fennic languages may be:

 Baltic-Finnic languages, the ones most commonly called 'Finnic' in Scandinavia and the West
 Finno-Permic languages, a hypothetical major branch of the Uralic languages
 Finno-Volgaic languages, an obsolete hypothetical branch of the Uralic languages
 All the languages in the groupings above; this is common usage in Russia where the non-Baltic Finnic languages are spoken

See also
Baltic Finnic peoples
Uralic languages#Classification

Finnic peoples